Targosz is a surname. It may refer to:

Łukasz Targosz (born 1977), Polish film composer, and music and film producer
Stanisław Targosz (1948–2013), Polish general

See also
Targoszów, a village in the administrative district of Gmina Stryszawa, within Sucha County, Lesser Poland Voivodeship, in southern Poland
Targoszyce, a village in the administrative district of Gmina Kobylin, within Krotoszyn County, Greater Poland Voivodeship, in west-central Poland
Targoszyn, a village in the administrative district of Gmina Mściwojów, within Jawor County, Lower Silesian Voivodeship, in south-western Poland